Nighttime Birds is the fourth full-length album of the Dutch rock band The Gathering, released on 6 June 1997 by Century Media Records. The album was recorded at Woodhouse Studios, Hagen, Germany, between 17 February and 15 March 1997 under the guidance of producer Siggi Bemm.

Track listing 

Tracks 10–11 taken from The May Song EP.
Tracks 12–15 taken from the In Motion DVD. Recorded live in Krakow, Poland, 1997

Tracks 1–8: EROC demo sessions recorded at Woodhouse Studios, Hagen, Germany, mixed by EROC, 15 to 30 November 1996.
Tracks 9–10 recorded at S&K Studios, Doetinchem, Netherlands, 1 to 4 September 1997. Taken from the Kevin's Telescope EP, produced by The Gathering & Dirk Kemper.
Track 11 taken from the Kevin's Telescope EP, remixed by EROC.
Track 12 recorded at Patrick Steenbakkers Audioprodukties, Shijndel, Netherlands, Summer 1996. Taken from the Liberty Bell EP, produced by Patrick Steenbakkers & The Gathering.
Tracks 13–14 recorded at RS 29 Studios, Wolluck, Netherlands, 30 March to 3 April 1996. Taken from the Adrenaline / Leaves EP, produced, engineered and mixed by Oscar Holleman & The Gathering.

Trivia 
 In the song "Nighttime Birds" (after minute 3:45) there is a sample of Indian flute music (a Raga Kafi) which can be heard in the Dutch theme park Efteling at the fairy tale of The Flying Fakir.
 The song "Nighttime Birds" contains a quote from the film Willy Wonka & the Chocolate Factory.

Personnel 
The Gathering
 Anneke van Giersbergen – lead vocals
 René Rutten – guitars, flute
 Jelmer Wiersma – guitars
 Frank Boeijen – synthesizers, grand piano
 Hugo Prinsen Geerligs – bass
 Hans Rutten – drums

Production
Siggi Bemm – producer, engineer, mixing
Matthias Klinkmann – engineer

Charts

References 

The Gathering (band) albums
Century Media Records albums
1997 albums